Clarence Ahart Brooks (1896–1969) was an American actor. He appeared in numerous films including in starring roles.  With Noble Johnson and James Thomas Smith he formed Lincoln Motion Picture Company in 1916. He starred in the 1921 film By Right of Birth.

He is featured in the 1989 documentary film That's Black Entertainment.

Filmography
The Realization of a Negro's Ambition (1916)
The Trooper of Company K (1916)
The Law of Nature (1916)
A Man's Duty (1919)
By Right of Birth (1921)
Absent (1928)
Georgia Rose (1930)
Arrowsmith (1931)
Murder in Harlem (1935), also released as Lem Hawkins' Confession 
Dark Manhattan (1937)Two-Gun Man from Harlem (1938)Harlem Rides the Range (1939)The Bronze Buckaroo (1939)Up Jumped the Devil (1941)Wild Women'' (1951)

References

External links

African-American male actors
1896 births
1969 deaths
20th-century American male actors
American male film actors
20th-century African-American people